Pupillometer, also spelled pupilometer, is a medical device intended to measure by reflected light the size of the pupil of the eye.
In addition to measuring pupil size, current automated pupillometers may also be able to characterize pupillary light reflex. Some instruments for measuring pupillary distance (PD) are often, but incorrectly, referred to as pupilometers.

Manual pupillometry 
A manual pupillometer measures pupil size via a comparison chart method. There are several types of manual pupillometers. The most common type is the Haab scale, or Haab's pupillometer, which is a series of graduated filled circles on a slide ruler.

Automated Pupillometry 

An automated pupillometer is a portable, handheld device that provides a reliable and objective measurement of pupillary size, symmetry, and reactivity through measurement of the pupillary light reflex. Independent of examiner, an automated pupillometer eliminates variability and subjectivity, expressing pupil reactivity numerically so that both pupil size and reactivity can be trended for changes, just like other vital signs. An automated pupillometer also provides a reliable and effective way to quantitatively classify and trend the pupil light response.

Using automated pupillometers and algorithms, NeurOptics' Neurological Pupil index (NPi) can offer a consolidated parametric approach to mitigate subjectivity.
The NPi and automated pupillometry have also recently been included in the updated 2020 American Heart Association (AHA) Guidelines for Cardiopulmonary Resuscitation (CPR) and Emergency Cardiovascular Care (ECC) as an objective measurement supporting brain injury prognosis in patients following cardiac arrest. Studies published in peer-reviewed journals continue to demonstrate the effectiveness of NeurOptics' NPi in helping clinicians improve patient outcomes.
The most effective way to use an automated pupillometer is to establish the earliest possible baseline measurement when the patient is admitted into the critical care unit or emergency department, and then trend for changes over time.

Pupil response 
Many automated pupilometers can also function as a type of pupil response monitor by measuring pupil dilation in response to a visual stimulus.

In ophthalmology, a pupillary response to light is differentiated from a pupillary response to focus (i.e. pupils may constrict on near focus, as with the Argyll Robertson pupil) in the diagnosis of tertiary syphilis.   Although a pupillometer can be used, the diagnosis is often made with a penlight & near-point card

The extent of dilation of the pupil in the eye could be an indicator of interest and attention.  Methods of reliable measurement of cognitive load, such as the dilation or constriction of the pupils, are used in marketing research to assess the attractiveness of TV commercials. Dilation of the pupils reflects an increase in mental processes, whether it be attentiveness, or psychomotor responsiveness. The pupil response has also been found to reflect long-term memory processes both at encoding, predicting the success of memory formation, and at retrieval reflecting the operation of different recognition outcomes.

Measuring pupillary distance 

In the context of dispensing eyeglasses, some instruments for measuring PD are colloquially referred to as a pupillometer even though "interpupillometer" is the appropriate term for this instrument.
There are many ways to measure PD ranging from a simple ruler (or "PD stick") traditionally used by eye care professionals (ECP) to the so-called pupillometers to state of the art digital systems that may offer better accuracy and precision while also allowing for various other measurements (e.g., vertex distance, pantoscopic tilt, wrap, etc.) to be taken.
Measurement accuracy is more of a concern for progressive lenses where small deviations can severely impact visual performance.

The PD measuring instruments referred to as a pupillometers are optical devices that rest on the nose bridge similar to eyeglass frames and work by sighting the corneal reflection produced by an internally-mounted coaxial light source (e.g. Essilor Corneal Reflection Pupillometer). These instruments are most commonly used for fitting glasses (i.e., center the lenses on the visual axes). However, they may also be used to verify a PD measurements taken with a PD stick. Since these instruments do not measure any actual pupil parameters (e.g., size, symmetry, reflex, etc.), they do not fall under the medical device definition of a pupillometer.

In addition to having PD measured in a retail setting, a variety of web and mobile (Android and iOS) apps are now widely available. Web apps are used by a variety of online sellers of eyeglasses where an object of known size, such as a credit card, is needed to assist (size reference) the measurement process.
Some mobile apps have eliminated the need for a reference object to make accurate PD measurements by leveraging depth imaging and advanced algorithms now available on some mobile platforms.

See also
Pupil
Pupillometry
Neurological Pupil index (NPi)
Psychophysiology

References

Ophthalmic equipment
Human pupil